This is a list of the Permanent Representatives of the Republic of Finland to the United Nations. The current office holder is Elina Kalkku.

List

See also
 Foreign relations of Finland

References

Finland
 
Diplomatic missions of Finland